Nabil Anani ( born 1943), is a Palestinian artist and one of the founders of the contemporary Palestinian art movement.

Biography 
After his graduation in 1969, from the faculty of Fine Arts at Alexandria University, Anani returned to Palestine to start his career as an artist and trainer at the UN training college in Ramallah.  His first exhibition in Jerusalem was in 1972 and has since exhibited widely in Europe, North America, the Middle East, North Africa and Japan.  He was appointed in 1998 as the head of the League of Palestinian Artists and was a key played to establish the first International Academy of Art in Palestine. Because his art was an expression of collective identity it encountered the military censorship of Israeli authorities, the combined use of four colors of the Palestinian flag was prohibited and he, together with the other members of the league, was subjected to arrest and interrogation. 
 Nabil was also awarded the first Palestinian National Prize for Visual Art in 1997 by Yasser Arafat.

Selected exhibitions 
 2014: “Life before 1948”, Zawyeh art gallery, Ramallah
 2013: ‘Spirit of the land”, Art on 56th, Beirut
 2011: “Art Palestine”, Meem Gallery, Dubai
 2007: ‘A Journey into Script’, Foyles Gallery, London
 2001: Sharjah Biennial
 1995: “It’s possible, Palestinian and Israeli artists”, National Museum, Washington

Memorials 
During his career, Nabil Anani was commissioned to work on building memorials in Palestine: 
 1986 Statue of aluminum front of the Inash Family Association building, in collaboration with Suleiman Mansour
 1987 mural front of Faculty of Educational Sciences and the College of Women's Society, Ramallah
 1993 Metal memorial statue in Kaukab Abu al-Hija park, Galilee
 2002 Statue of Liberty in Ramallah

See also 

Zawyeh art gallery

References

External links 

1943 births
Living people
Palestinian contemporary artists
Alexandria University alumni
Palestinian expatriates in Egypt